Space Defense Center was a 1960-70s operations center in Cheyenne Mountain

Space Defense Center may also refer to:

 Aerospace Defense Center, a 1979-86 USAF Direct Reporting Unit after the major command, Aerospace Defense Command, was deactivated
 Ballistic Missile Defense Center, a "mid-1970s" operations center at Cheyenne Mountain Complex
 Joint Space Operations Center, a joint center for branches of the Department of Defense
 Missile and Space Intelligence Center of the Defense Intelligence Agency
 Missile Defense Integration and Operations Center at Schriever Air Force Base
 Mission Control Center at the Ronald Reagan Ballistic Missile Defense Test Site on Kwajalein Atoll
 National Space Defense Center, renamed from Joint Interagency Combined Space Operations Center (JICSpOC) in 2017
 Space and Missile Defense Technical Center (SMDTC), a component of United States Army Space and Missile Defense Command
 Space and Missile Defense Acquisition Center (SMDAC), a component of United States Army Space and Missile Defense Command
 Space Control Center, a Vandenberg AFB facility moved from Cheyenne Mountain in 2006
 Space Defense Operations Center (SPADOC), a Cheyenne Mountain operations center in warm standby